Edward Milsom was a professional rugby league footballer who played in the 1890s.

References

External links

 Search for "Milsom" at rugbyleagueproject.org

Place of birth missing
Place of death missing
Rugby league five-eighths
Rugby league halfbacks
English rugby league players
Wakefield Trinity players
Year of birth missing
Year of death missing